Runestad is a surname. Notable people with the surname include:

Jake Runestad (born 1986), American composer and conductor 
Jim Runestad (born 1959), American politician